Intelcystiscus is a genus of minute sea snail, a marine gastropod mollusc or micromollusc in the family Cystiscidae.

Species
Species within the genus Intelcystiscus include:
Intelcystiscus coyi Espinosa & Ortea, 2002
Intelcystiscus gordonmoorei Ortea & Espinosa, 2001
Intelcystiscus rancholunensis Espinosa & Ortea, 2006
Intelcystiscus teresacarrenoae Ortea & Espinosa, 2016
Intelcystiscus yemayae Espinosa & Ortea, 2003

References 

 
Cystiscidae